Eric Tulla (born 23 August 1948) is a sailor from Puerto Rico, who represented his country at the 1984 Summer Olympics in Los Angeles, United States as helmsman in the Soling. With crew members Jerry Pignolet and Ronnie Ramos they took the 19th place.

References

Living people
1948 births
Sailors at the 1984 Summer Olympics – Soling
Olympic sailors of Puerto Rico
Puerto Rican male sailors (sport)
20th-century Puerto Rican people